{{Infobox character
| name = Millia Rage
| image = File:Millia Rage GG.png
| caption = Millia Rage in Guilty Gear Strive
| series = [[Guilty Gear (series)|Guilty Gear]]
| firstgame = Guilty Gear (1998)
| creator = Daisuke Ishiwatari
| voice = 
| nationality = Russian
| origin =  Russia
}}
 (Миллия Рейдж) is a fictional character in Arc System Works's Guilty Gear video game series. She first appeared in the 1998 video game Guilty Gear. In the series, Millia is a retired assassin who fights with her own hair, which is prehensile and able to change its size and shape.

Creation
Millia is named after American thrash-metal band Meliah Rage. Daisuke Ishiwatari created Millia's character to, through her relationship with Zato, convey the feelings of a person who loves someone who is rejected from society.

 Appearances 
After the death of her parents, she is adopted into a nearby assassin syndicate, the Assassin's Guild. There, she learns the Sixth Hi-Deigokutsuipou (or the "Six Forbidden Magics"), "Angra", which allows Millia's hair to model as she wants. Due to Zato-1's rise in power within the Guild, Millia seals him within a dimensional portal, and abandons the guild shortly thereafter, finding no comfort in the cruel ways of an assassin. In Guilty Gear (1998), Millia uses the Second Holy Order's Fighting Tournament as a method of tracking down Zato, who has escaped from the dimensional prison, to kill him. However, she can not do it as she is manipulated like the rest of the cast, and the bloodshed from the tournament releases Justice from her slumber. She still in search of Zato in Guilty Gear X (2000). Panicked about a Gear with free-will, countries establish another tournament, awarding a prize to whoever captures the Gear. Millia uses this as another chance to find Zato. Canonically, she finds him, seemingly killing him. Unknown to her, a symbiotic creature named Eddie takes control of Zato's body.

In Guilty Gear X2 (2002), she receives sightings of a being similar to that of Zato's Forbidden Beast, Eddie. In XX, Millia has three different endings. In the first, faces Slayer just before she is about to confront Eddie. After a fight Millia manages to hold her ground but is unable to defeat him, Slayer tells Millia that her hair is of the same origins as Eddie, though Millia says she already knows it. In the second ending, she defeats Slayer and subsequently kills Eddie. The third ending shows that, after killing Eddie, she buries Zato's body. In Guilty Gear XX Accent Core Plus (2008), Millia sets off to find and kill Eddie and destroy the Assassin's Guild. In her first ending, she finishes her vendetta, as she slays Eddie. She continues to live on a run from the Assassin's Guild, but did not falter in her mind and continues to keep her hair under control. In the second ending, however, she loses the control of her hair and accidentally kills Bridget. As she stands horrified on her act, she is accidentally stabbed in the back by her fan, but she felt content as she died as herself, not as a monster.

By Guilty Gear Xrd (2014), Millia had made peace with Venom and worked together with him to find the resurrected Zato-1. Working with a reformed Assassin Guilt led by Zato-1, Millia became a new director of a reformed Post-War Administration Bureau in Guilty Gear Strive (2021). Both Millia and Zato are summoned by the third king of Illirya Kingdom, Daryl to investigate I-No’s next plan, after she took something from an imprisoned Ariels, later revealed to be a demon-like sorcerer Happy Chaos. With the help of Anji and Chipp, during Chaos’ terrorist attack on the U.S. white house, or rather an airship Tir Na Nog, Millia and the rest of the world learned the true identity of I-No’s accomplish, his past relation to Asuka and the previous events. After I-No’s demise at the hands of Sol Badguy (now a human named Fredrick Bulsara), Millia and Zato are last seen being regular customers of Venom and Robo-Ky’s Bakery.

Millia is also a playable character in the spin-off games Guilty Gear Petit (2001), Isuka (2003), Dust Strikers (2006), and Judgment (2006).

Reception
Millia Rage was referenced by Destructoid as being "a classic Guilty Gear character and fan favorite". In a 2013 poll conducted by Arc System Works, Millia was voted as the 13th most popular character from the series. IGN staff was impressed by the animation of Millia's hair movement as it "has a life all its own as it launches out at enemies, repels attack, and surrounds her." In addition, they stated she is "just terribly cute", a sentiment shared by GameSpot's Greg Kasavin who labelled her as "cute yet not-so-surprisingly powerful". IGN also noted her as one of "Guilty Gears faster characters", a remark shared by Todd Ciolek from Anime News Network (ANN). She was included in the Complexs list of "The 25 Best Looking Sideline Chicks in Games", with the writer Elton Jones saying she "stands out to us the most" due to her ability to cause damage by using only her hair. The ability caused her to be called a "Medusa-esque" character by Miguel Lopez from GameSpot. In a Guilty Gear X review for Allgame, Gavin Frankle said no other character from the series had a more "unique fighting style" than Millia. It also led her to be featured in an article titled "Gaming's 19 most impractical hairstyles" by GamesRadar's Lucas Sullivan, who said what she can do with her hair "is truly impressive", and described her hairstyle as "The Rapunzel". This latter feeling was shared by Ciolek, who noted the similarities between Millia and the Rapunzel from Disney's film Tangled. The ANN's reviewer declared he was not impressed by Bayonetta as he felt the main character is "a rip-off" of Millia. Ciolek noted similarities between their hair manipulation abilities, stating "The only real difference is that Millia doesn't actually wear her hair or get nearly naked in battle". On the other hand, IGN said "Millia Rage takes bizarreness to lofty heights", and ranked her hair as the sixth "goofiest weapon" in their Top 10. Similarly, she was mentioned by 1UP.com as one of Guilty Gear''s "goofy characters" along with I-No and Faust.

References

Fictional assassins in video games
Guilty Gear characters
Female characters in video games
Fictional Russian people in video games
Orphan characters in video games
Video game characters introduced in 1998
Woman soldier and warrior characters in video games